A Prince Among Thieves is the second studio album by hip hop artist Prince Paul. A Prince Among Thieves was well received by music critics. Music essayist Robert Christgau has called it "the closest thing to a true rock opera you've ever heard".

Background 
The concept follows the story of an aspiring young emcee named Tariq, played by emcee Breezly Brewin, who needs to collect money to record a demo tape before a meeting with Wu-Tang Clan leader RZA. The story follows a desperate Tariq, who skips work at his low-paying job and turns to his friend True, played by emcee Big Sha, who introduces him to drug dealing. The two make their way through the drug world, a police ambush, jail, and, finally, a deadly showdown.

The album features cameos by Kool Keith, Big Daddy Kane, Chubb Rock, Biz Markie, De La Soul, Everlast, Sadat X, Xzibit, Kid Creole, Special Ed, Chris Rock, RZA and Buckshot.

While recording, Prince Paul tried to get Vanilla Ice to appear on the album delivering a verse as one of the convicts in the jail scene, but was turned down by Ice's manager.

A single version and video in the style of a film trailer was also produced. Although conceived as a story that would be filmed, a movie never came about. In a 2013 interview, Prince Paul said:

Track listing 

Sample credits
 "Pain" samples "Pain" by The Watts Prophets. 
 "Steady Slobbin'" samples "Reach Out" by Average White Band.
 "What U Got" samples "I'll Play the Blues for You" by Albert King.
 "The Other Line" samples "You Better Get It" by Joe Tex.
 "Weapon World" samples "Get Outta My Life Woman" by The New Apocalypse.
 "War Party" samples "Love Without Sex" by Gwen McCrae.
 "Macula's Theory" samples "Wind, Blow Her Back My Way" by Syl Johnson.
 "More Than U Know" samples "I Like It (Corn Flakes) by Extra T's.
 "Mood for Love" samples "Impeach the President" by The Honeydrippers.
 "The Men in Blue" samples "Synthetic Substitution" by Melvin Bliss.
 "Handle Your Time" samples "Having You Around" by Skull Snaps and "Why Can't People Be Colors Too?" by The Whatnauts.
 "You Got Shot" sample "Midnight Theme" by Manzel and "Brooklyn Zoo" by Ol' Dirty Bastard.

Personnel

The cast 

 Tariq: Breezly Brewin
 True: Big Sha
 Mother: Monkey
 Officer O'Maley Bitchkowski: Everlast
 Crazy Lou: Kool Keith
 Mr. Large: Chubb Rock
 Mr. Large Security: Ken (Special K) Spellman
 Breakneck: Special Ed
 Diehard: Biz Markie
 Hooker: Sweet Dee
 Crackhead: Chris Rock
 Crackhead Girl: Queen Bee
 RZA: Himself

 Count Macula: Big Daddy Kane
 The Reverend: Dom Dom
 Convicts: Sadat X, Xzibit, Kid Creole
 Buckshot: Himself
 Thug Group: Horror City
 Paramedic 1: Rodd Houston
 Paramedic 2: Wendy Day
 Tariq's Sister (Starkeisha): Karima
 Police Officer 2: Phil Painson
 Police Captain: Danny Madorski
 Wu Receptionist: Kamala Gordon
 Tammy: Heroine
 Customers: De La Soul

The DJs and VJs 
 DJ Evil Dee
 Bobbito
 DJ Mecca
 Bobby Simmons
 Andre (Bless Me) Smith
 Ken (Special K) Spellman
 DJ Atlas
 Artist
 Lynn Gonzales
 Rotimi Rainwater

Background extras 

 Michelle Willems
 Patty Santos
 Faradina Lael
 Jackie Martinez
 Shara
 Queen
 Big Pat
 The Deadly Snakes
 Bobby Simmons
 Regina Moore

 Lady Leo
 Mel Vives
 Mr. Dead
 Don Newkirk
 Bimos
 Michael Preston
 Richard Preston
 Nyce
 Edward Huston
 El-P

Charts 
Album

Singles

References

Prince Paul (producer) albums
1999 albums
Concept albums
Tommy Boy Records albums
Albums produced by Prince Paul (producer)
Rap operas